Nikol Stankulova is a Bulgarian model and TV host. She appeared on Channel 1, MM, Sport TV, Nova TV.

Life 
Stankulova was born on 8 August 1988 in Sofia. She is the only child in the family of police officer of the 3rd Precinct Police Station Nikolay Stankulov and the investigator of the SDRH Elena Stankulova. At age six, she won her first beauty contest, and at 7 was already a leading TV broadcaster. As a child, she split her time between rhythmic gymnastics, swimming, ballet, piano, mathematics, and posting for fashion magazines.

She graduated from Sofia's Mathematical High School and in parallel with her and First English Language School as a private student. As a student she enrolled in Finance at the University of National and World Economy.

The experience from the Bulgarian National Television, led her to the "I want" program on MM. At the same time she was a model in "Ivet Fashion". Until April 2009, she was the host of "The Big Question" program on Nova TV, followed by the news of Sportal.bg and Profit.bg. Later, she worked at "Coffee". In June 2010 she joined the Nova TV morning block - "Hello, Bulgaria", where she presented the weather forecast.

In 2012, she entered the Big Brother (Bulgaria) house, where she reached the final on November 17 with Orlin Pavlov, Dimitar Kovachev - Funky, Katsi Vaptsarov and Blagoy Ivanov - Bagata. She finished 4th out of five remaining finalists.

References

External links 

 https://www.marica.bg/nikol-stankulova-bremenna-ot-milionerski-sin-snimka-Article-140171.html
 https://trafficnews.bg/bohemi/nikol-stankulova-ochakva-parvoto-si-dete-109462/

Living people
1988 births
Bulgarian television presenters
University of National and World Economy alumni
Bulgarian models